Timothy Ray Wadsworth (born June 3, 1957) is an American politician who has served in the Alabama House of Representatives from the 14th district since 2014.

References

1957 births
Living people
Republican Party members of the Alabama House of Representatives
21st-century American politicians